Old Explorers is a 1990 American drama film directed by Bill Pohlad and starring José Ferrer (final film role) and James Whitmore.

Plot

Two elderly gentlemen dream about recreating explorations and adventures.

Cast
José Ferrer as Warner Watney
James Whitmore as Leinen Roth

References

External links
 
 

American drama films
1990 drama films
1990 films
1990s English-language films
Films directed by Bill Pohlad
1990s American films